Fernando Javier Pierucci (born November 28, 1979 in Arteaga) is a former Argentine professional football player.

He played on the professional level in Primera División Argentina for Rosario Central and Club Almagro.

1979 births
Living people
Sportspeople from Santa Fe Province
Argentine footballers
Association football forwards
Argentine Primera División players
Rosario Central footballers
Club Almagro players
Chilean Primera División players
Universidad de Chile footballers
Ecuadorian Serie A players
C.D. ESPOLI footballers
Segunda División B players
Tercera División players
CD Comarca de Níjar players
AD Cerro de Reyes players
Argentine expatriate footballers
Expatriate footballers in Chile
Expatriate footballers in Ecuador
Expatriate footballers in Italy
Expatriate footballers in Spain
Argentine expatriate sportspeople in Chile
Argentine expatriate sportspeople in Ecuador
Argentine expatriate sportspeople in Italy
Argentine expatriate sportspeople in Spain